Viktor Eyrikhovich Gaus (born 25 November 1964) is a Russian professional football coach and a former player. He is the goalkeepers' coach with FC Krylia Sovetov Samara.

Club career
He made his professional debut in the Soviet First League in 1987 for FC Krylia Sovetov Kuybyshev.

He made his Russian Premier League debut for Krylia Sovetov on 29 March 1992 in a game against FC Spartak Moscow and played 4 seasons in the RPL with Krylia Sovetov and FC Lada Togliatti.

References

1964 births
People from Kireyevsky District
Living people
Soviet footballers
Association football goalkeepers
Russian footballers
Soviet First League players
Russian Premier League players
PFC Krylia Sovetov Samara players
FC Lada-Tolyatti players
FC Rubin Kazan players
FC Neftyanik Ufa players
FC Neftekhimik Nizhnekamsk players
FC Nosta Novotroitsk players
Sportspeople from Tula Oblast